Ara Cristine Pascual Klenk (born February 5, 1989), known professionally as Cristine Reyes, is a Filipino actress, model, dancer and endorser. She is often called the "Ultimate Star" by the local media for her acting prowess and popularity.

Dubbed as one of the "New Drama Royalty" of her generation, Reyes won the highly coveted "Box Office Queen" award with Anne Curtis at the 43rd GMMSF Box Office Entertainment Awards. She is also a four-time FAMAS Award nominee (including 3 Best Actress nods). In 2020, she won "Best Actress" at the 40th Oporto International Film Festival for her performance in the 2019 thriller 'Untrue'.

Reyes is popularly recognized as a Sex symbol for her attractive aura and physique. FHM Philippines crowned her as 2009's sexiest woman in the world, winning against Marian Rivera, Katrina Halili & Angel Locsin. The same year, she was also listed as one of the Top 25 sexiest women of the decade.

Reyes has already starred in multiple blockbuster films including: No Other Woman (₱278 million), Seven Sundays (₱271 million), Bromance: My Brother's Romance (₱163 million), The Gifted (₱110 million) and Ang Darling kong Aswang (₱100 million).

Career
Reyes was a finalist in GMA Network's highly-acclaimed reality show, StarStruck (season 1). She went on to play minor roles in hit TV shows like Mulawin (2004), Darna (2005), and Marimar (2007). In 2008, she transferred to the rival ABS-CBN network. Reyes played daring roles in TV shows such as Eva Fonda (2008) and Tubig at Langis (2016).

In 2009, Viva Films founder Vic del Rosario intended to cast Reyes in a raunchy horror film titled Patient X, but stopped short of making the film sexually explicit in order for it to be allowed exhibition in the cinemas of SM Supermalls.

She made her breakthrough as a scorned wife in her debut film, No Other Woman (2011), co-starring Anne Curtis and Derek Ramsay. It was one of the highest-grossing film in the Philippines in 2011. Her film career is currently managed by the film company Viva Films.

In 2020, Reyes returned to GMA-7 after 12 years following the ABS-CBN shutdown.

In 2022, Reyes was cast in the lead role of Imee Marcos in the period film Maid in Malacañang, about the last days of the Marcos presidential family in Malacañang Palace in 1986. She later reprised her role in the 2023 sequel Martyr or Murderer.

Personal life
Reyes gave birth to her first child, a daughter named Amarah, with her boyfriend Ali Khatibi, a mixed martial artist, on February 8, 2015. She got engaged to Khatibi on September 14, 2015. The couple married in a private ceremony on January 27, 2016, in Balesin Island, Polillo, Quezon.

In 2019, she confirmed her separation from Khatibi.

Filmography

Television

Film

Discography

Soundtrack
Track Listing Composer: Tootsie Guevara
2012 Dahil sa Pag-Ibig – "Nang Dahil sa Pag-ibig"

Albums
Christine (2010)

Awards and nominations

Special awards and recognition

Rankings

References

External links

1989 births
Living people
People from Marikina
Actresses from Metro Manila
Participants in Philippine reality television series
StarStruck (Philippine TV series) participants
GMA Network personalities
ABS-CBN personalities
Viva Artists Agency
21st-century Filipino actresses
Filipino child actresses
Filipino film actresses
Filipino television actresses
Filipino women comedians